Investigating Sex is a 2001 comedy-drama film written and directed by Alan Rudolph, and stars Neve Campbell, Til Schweiger, Nick Nolte and Dermot Mulroney, and based on the book Recherches sur la sexualité by Jose Pierre.

After a long delay, the film was released on DVD in the U.S. with a different title, Intimate Affairs, on December 23, 2007.

Plot 
Set in the year 1929 in Cambridge, Massachusetts, Edgar Faldo is a young professor who decides to assemble a group of friends at his family mansion to discuss the topic of sex and its advantages. Edgar hires two young women to work as stenographers to record the daily debates that his friends discuss to scientifically study sex. The two women, the sexually active Zoe and the frigid-plain Alice, have mixed feelings being around as Edgar brings over three of his friends, who include oddball English artist Sevy, German writer and novelist Monty, and fellow professor Peter. Edgar's father, Mr. Faldo, shows up with his new trophy wife, Sasha, to oversee the events as others who are Lorenz, Oscar, Sevy's wife Janet, and Edgar's disapproving French girlfriend, Chloe, all turn up during different meeting sessions to talk and interact with everyone on the taboos spoken for the "experiment" as Edgar puts it.

Cast

External links 

 
 

2001 films
2001 comedy-drama films
2000s English-language films
Films directed by Alan Rudolph
Films based on French novels
American comedy-drama films
Films set in 1929
Films set in Massachusetts
2001 comedy films
2001 drama films
2000s American films